Kin is an Irish television crime drama series, co-created by Peter McKenna and Ciaran Donnelly, that first broadcast on 9 September 2021, on RTÉ. The series, which revolves around a fictional Dublin family embroiled in gangland war, stars Aiden Gillen and Ciarán Hinds as rival gang leaders, Frank Kinsella and Eamonn Cunningham.

The series was first announced in November 2020, with co-creator Peter McKenna set as showrunner and Diarmuid Goggins as director of the first four episodes. Tessa Hoffe was later announced as director of episodes five to eight. In February 2022, the series premiered in the United States and Canada on AMC+, with Sundance Now premiering the series in the UK. A second series was announced on 10 February 2022, with production having begun in July.

Background
Prior to the series premiere', several news outlets stated the series was inspired by the Kinahan gang and the Hutch–Kinahan feud, and noted similarities to former RTE staple Love/Hate. A show "insider" stated that "This is not the Kinahans' story, but people can draw their own conclusions. Viewers will be able to make up their own mind about it."

Cast

Main
 Charlie Cox as Michael Kinsella
 Clare Dunne as Amanda Kinsella
 Aidan Gillen as Frank Kinsella
 Emmett J. Scanlan as Jimmy Kinsella
 Maria Doyle Kennedy as Bridget 'Birdy' Goggins
 Sam Keeley as Eric 'Viking' Kinsella
 Yasmin Seky as Nikita Murphy
 Ciarán Hinds as Eamon Cunningham

Supporting
 Hannah Adeogun as Anna Areoye
 Mark Mckenna Jr. as Anthony Kinsella 
 Keith McErlean as Con Doyle
 Ryan Lincoln as Isaac 'Kem' Kemela
 Ben Carolan as Glen Wright
 Neill Fleming	as Dotser Reid
 Thomas Kane-Byrne as Francis 'Fudge' Flynn
 Cian Fitzsimons as Jamie Kinsella
 Fiona Bell as Angela Cunningham
 Lloyd Cooney as Caolon Moore
 Stephen Jones as Noel Lawlor
 Denise McCormack as Jenny Lawlor

Episodes

Reception
The review aggregator website Rotten Tomatoes reported a 100% approval rating with an average rating of 7.0/10, based on 9 critic reviews.

Alex McLevy of The A.V. Club gave the series a B- and wrote: "It's simply an opportunity to watch some gifted actors do what they do, very well, with a story that glides along in entertaining but unoriginal manner."

References

External links
 
 

2021 Irish television series debuts
2020s Irish television series
Irish drama television series
Irish crime television series
English-language television shows
AMC (TV channel) original programming
RTÉ original programming
Works about organised crime in Ireland
Television series about organized crime